Adriana Aizenberg (born 1 December 1938) is an Argentine film and television actress.

She has appeared in film since the year 1967 making her debut in El ABC del amor making some sixteen appearances to date.

She appeared in the popular 2004 Daniel Burman film, El abrazo partido alongside Uruguayan actor Daniel Hendler and more recently in '[[A Través de Tus Ojos|'A través de tus ojos]] in the role of Nilda in 2006.

Filmography
 El ABC del amor (1967)
 La Raulito (1975) aka Little Raoul Plata dulce (1982) aka Easy Money Sostenido en La menor (1986)
 Revancha de un amigo (1987)
 Mundo grúa (1999) aka Crane World La venganza (1999) aka The Revenge Buenos Aires 100 kilómetros (2004)
 18-J (2004) "Mitzvah" Episode
 El Abrazo partido (2004) aka Lost Embrace Ropa sucia (2005)
 A través de tus ojos (2006)
 Derecho de familia (2006) aka Family LawTelevision
 El Mundo de Gasalla (1990) TV series
 Poliladron (1994) TV series also known as Cops and Robbers Vulnerables (1999) TV series
 0800 no llames (2005) mini TV series
 Amas de Casa Desesperadas'' (2006) TV series

References

External links
 

Argentine television actresses
Argentine film actresses
1938 births
Living people
Argentine people of German-Jewish descent
Jewish Argentine actresses
Place of birth missing (living people)